The 1914–15 Danish National Football Tournament was supposed to have been the third Danish football championship, but was cancelled since World War I made travelling greater distances difficult. The regional championships were still held, however.

Format
The tournament would have retained the same format as last year, had it not been cancelled.

Provincial winners
The five provincial winners below would have competed in the province tournament had it been held.
BBU (Bornholm): IK Viking
FBU (Funen): Odense BK
JBU (Jutland): Vejle BK
LFBU (Lolland-Falster): B 1901
SBU (Zealand): Helsingør IF

Copenhagen Championship

External links
Denmark - List of final tables (RSSSF)
Landsfodboldturneringen 1914/15 at danskfodbold.com

1914–15 in Danish football
Top level Danish football league seasons
Denmark